John Wolf Kemp House was a historic home located at Colonie in Albany County, New York.  It was built about 1780 and was a 2-story, L-shaped frame farmhouse with a gable roof and five bays wide. It had a -story rear ell. It featured a 1-story hip-roofed enclosed porch over the three central bays.  The entrance and side parlors have Federal-style details.  Also on the property were a contributing privy and summer kitchen. The house was demolished in May 2003.

It was listed on the National Register of Historic Places in 1985.

References

Houses on the National Register of Historic Places in New York (state)
Federal architecture in New York (state)
Houses completed in 1780
Houses in Albany County, New York
National Register of Historic Places in Albany County, New York
Demolished buildings and structures in New York (state)
Buildings and structures demolished in 2003